Norman John "Bill" Budd (October 13, 1887 – January 6, 1966) was an American football player and coach. He served as the head football coach at Duquesne University from 1913 to 1914, compiling a record of 4–10–1. As a college football player, he was a quarterback at the University of Pittsburgh in 1910.

Head coaching record

References

External links
 

1887 births
1966 deaths
American football quarterbacks
Duquesne Dukes football coaches
Pittsburgh Panthers football players
People from Sharon, Pennsylvania
Coaches of American football from Pennsylvania
Players of American football from Pennsylvania